Hylton Knowles (17 November 1928 – 16 February 2009) was a South African cricketer. He played in nine first-class matches for Eastern Province between 1952/53 and 1958/59.

See also
 List of Eastern Province representative cricketers

References

External links
 

1928 births
2009 deaths
South African cricketers
Eastern Province cricketers
Cricketers from Durban